Fierce were a British three-piece, all girl R&B group. They were signed to Colin Lester and Ian McAndrew's Wildstar Records, and scored four hit singles on the UK Singles Chart in 1999 and 2000. The biggest of the hits, "Sweet Love 2K", was a cover of the Anita Baker song "Sweet Love".

Discography

Albums

Singles

Notes 

 1 The version of "Sweet Love" that features on Fierce's album Right Here Right Now was produced by Jeremy Wheatley and Magnus Fiennes. The single version was re-titled "Sweet Love 2K" and was produced by Stargate.

References

External links
Fierce at Discogs

British contemporary R&B musical groups
English girl groups
Black British musical groups
British musical trios
British R&B girl groups
Musical groups established in 1998
Musical groups disestablished in 2000
1998 establishments in England
2000 disestablishments in England